I Am Gen Z is a 2021 documentary film about the impact of the digital revolution on our society, our brains and mental health, and how the forces driving it are working against humanity.  This has huge ramifications for the first generation growing up with mobile digital technology - Generation Z, born between 1997 and 2012.

Produced by Chantelle De Carvalho and directed and edited by Liz Smith, the film's music was composed by film composer Kim Halliday. I Am Gen Z premiered at the 2021 Copenhagen International Documentary Film Festival (CPH:DOX).  The film is available in two versions, 100 minutes and a shortened 52 minutes.

The issues raised in the film are not only of interest to the Generation Z community, but also to parents, carers and educators, and the film attempts to promote a greater understanding of the effects of the technology on the mental health and development of young people.  Part of that endeavour is an innovative programme of educational outreach that runs alongside broadcast and VOD releases.

Background 
The documentary juxtaposes expert testimony against commentary and content from Generation Z contributors, the first generation to grow up with mobile digital technology.   Contributing psychologists, scientists, writers and digital technologists include Dr. Tracy A. Dennis-Tiwary, Tim Kendall, Natasha Devon MBE, Paul Barrett, Dr Jack Lewis, Jamie Bartlett, Clive Thompson, Dr Paul Marsden, Johnny Tooze, Marc Atherton, Dr Leslie Carr, Professor Sir Simon Wessely, Dr David Halpern and Kathy Sheehan. 

The film explores a wide variety of issues facing the Generation Z community including the effect of smartphones, body image & self harm, mental health, dating and relationships, the power of Algorithms and AI, misinformation, and conspiracy theories.  The nature and science of each issue is explained by experts, along with discussions and content from Generation Z who have been affected or influenced by them.

Synopsis 
An investigation through expert interviews and the web lens of Generation Z, the documentary explores the impact of the digital revolution on our society, our brains and our mental health, how the forces driving it are working against humanity and have put us on a dangerous trajectory that has huge consequences for the first generation growing up with "always on" mobile digital technology.

Unfiltered viewpoints from a cast of Generation Z characters are expressed through their screen worlds, interplaying with expert analysis from psychologists, scientists, writers and digital technologists from the Generation X and Boomer years, as we explore how the explosion of the digital revolution is impacting our society, our brains and mental health.

This exploration of Generation Z shows the new normal for many young people today, whether in a small town in Arizona, London or the hubbub of New York. With self-deprecating humour, they talk to us in their language, through TikTok, YouTube and Instagram.

The children of Generation Z are becoming adults in a world mediated by digital technologies with little or no transparency, a planet facing climate change and an unprecedented global pandemic. We see the unfiltered reality of the mental health issues that Generation Z face, we are challenged to question: were we not blind to how smartphones would affect the lives of those being born around that time?  Digital technology promised so much, but are the forces driving it too powerful for us to prevent a negative effect on the futures of Generation Z? Generation Z tell us how they see their future and how they refuse to be the ones to allow the negative effects to win.

Cast 

 Preston Seraph - Generation Z activist (USA)
 Dr. Tracy A. Dennis-Tiwary, Ph.D. - Professor of Psychology and Neuroscience at The City University of New York (USA)
 Noella - Generation Z activist (USA)
 Lucy Rydell - Generation Z activist (USA)
 Tim Kendall - CEO of Moment, former President of Pinterest, former Director of Monetization at Facebook (USA)
 Natasha Devon MBE - writer & activist (UK)
 Dr Jack Lewis - neuroscientist, television personality & author (UK)
 Dr Paul Marsden - consumer psychologist (UK)
 Marc Atherton - Chartered Psychologist and Behavioural Scientist (UK)
 Lottie Hartnack - Generation Z Musician
 MIRI - musician

Educational Outreach 
Part of the release programme for I Am Gen Z is an educational outreach licence, which allows schools, colleges and universities to screen the film in an educational context to students and academics.  These licences allow the film to be shown as part of wider discussion, learning and understanding of the issues raised in the film, with additional material to support lesson planning, including virtual or personal appearances by the filmmakers and musicians from the film.

Reception 
The response to the film has been largely positive, but particularly in educational settings, where comments included "Sometimes you watch a film and wish it could be screened in every school, not just for the pupils but also their parents and teachers". (Movie Marker), and "the ground covered is impressive and the talking heads ... do know what they’re talking about" (Movie Steve).

The film has been successful in many Human Rights Film Festivals around the World, and was also shown at CPH:DOX, Raindance Film Festival.

The film won the Best Feature award at the 2022 Lower East Side Film Festival in New York

See also 
 Algorithmic radicalization
 Digital media use and mental health
 Mass surveillance
 Pizzagate Conspiracy Theory
 Problematic social media use
 The Great Hack
 The Social Network

References

External links 

cocoandclaude.com
liz-smith.com
kimhalliday.com
 whatsgoingoninyourhead.org

2021 documentary films
2021 films
Documentary films about mental health
Films about eating disorders
Documentary films about mental disorders
Documentary films about technology
Films about social media
Generation Z
2020s English-language films